Liam Fitzpatrick may refer to:

Liam Fitzpatrick (Suite Life of Zack & Cody)
Liam Fitzpatrick (Veronica Mars)